Son Na-eun (born February 10, 1994), known mononymously as Naeun, is a South Korean singer and actress. She gained popularity following her debut as a member of the South Korean girl group, Apink. Apart from her group's activities, Son has also starred in various television series such as The Great Seer (2012), My Kids Give Me a Headache (2012–2013), Second 20s (2015), Cinderella with Four Knights (2016), The Most Beautiful Goodbye (2017), Dinner Mate (2020), Ghost Doctor (2022) and Agency (2023).

In April 2021, Son left IST Entertainment and remained a member of Apink until April 8, 2022 before withdrawing from the group. Soon after leaving IST, she joined YG Entertainment as an actress.

Life and career

1994–2010: Early life and career beginnings
Son was born on February 10, 1994, in Gangnam District, Seoul, South Korea. She was born into a family lineage with interest in arts. Her mother is an art museum director while her younger sister, named Son Sae-eun, pursues a career in the sports industry as a professional golf player in South Korea. She attended Chungdam High School and later transferred to School of Performing Arts Seoul (SOPA), from which she graduated on February 7, 2013. That same year, she was accepted into Dongguk University's Department of Theatre and Film with a major in acting. She was also chosen as an ambassador for the said university in 2014 alongside Girls' Generation's Yoona and Park Ha-sun.

Originally dreaming to become a painter, Son coincidentally stumbled upon auditions for South Korean record label JYP Entertainment. She impulsively attended the auditions and performed "It's Not Love" by Wonder Girls. Thereafter, she was notified of passing their audition and subsequently became a trainee under the agency. However, she soon moved to Cube Entertainment and continued as a trainee. In the midst of training, 16-year-old Son appeared in the music videos "Breath" and "Beautiful" by Beast as its female lead.

2011–2016: Debut with Apink and acting debut

Son was the first Apink member to be announced in February 2011. The group released their debut EP Seven Springs of Apink on April 19 alongside a music video for its lead single "I Don't Know" (몰라요). On April 21, Son officially debuted with Apink under A Cube Entertainment (currently IST Entertainment), an independent label under Cube Entertainment. That same day they began broadcasting promotions on Mnet's M Countdown performing their songs "I Don't Know" (몰라요), and "Wishlist".

In 2012, Son made her acting debut as the teenage Hae-in in the historical drama The Great Seer. She then made her film debut in the fifth installment of comedy series Marrying the Mafia, titled "Return of the Noble Family". Thereafter, Son played supporting roles in family drama Childless Comfort and romantic comedy Second 20s. In 2016, she co-starred in tvN's romantic comedy Cinderella with Four Knights.

Throughout 2013 and 2014, Son starred in fourth installment of MBC reality television series We Got Married with Shinee's Taemin as a virtual married couple, for which her performance on the show won her the "Star of the Year" award and a nomination for the "Best Couple" award at the 2013 MBC Entertainment Awards. The pair were cast as the show's youngest virtual married couple in its history. The virtual married couple bid their farewell to the viewers following the airing of their last episode on January 4, 2014, after 8 months which consisted of 36 aired episodes.

2017–present: Continued solo activities
In 2017, it was confirmed that Son will star in the horror film The Wrath. The same year, she was cast in Noh Hee-kyung's four-episode miniseries The Most Beautiful Goodbye. In 2020, Son starred in MBC's new drama Dinner Mate as a popular social media influencer.

In January 2021, Son was announced to be appearing in the drama Lost.

In April 2021, Son departed from Play M Entertainment after 10 years with the label. However, she will still continue as a member of the group and will participate in their 10th anniversary album later in the year. Later in May 2021, Son signed a contract with YG Entertainment as an actress.

On April 8, 2022, it was reported that Son would be withdrawing from the group Apink due to difficulty balancing work as both an actress and idol.  This was later confirmed by IST Entertainment via the group’s fancafe.

Artistry

Influence 
Son revealed the moment she was certain she wished to pursue a career in the South Korean music industry was because of veteran singer BoA.

Public image 
Among the South Korean commercial industry, Son is often referred to as the "sold-out girl". The nickname originated after all products Son advertised for began to sell out in record time. Photos with any product uploaded on her social media also prompted the items to sell out, including Adidas leggings which were dubbed as "Naeun Leggings" and was viewed as its unofficial model. A liquor brand's product also was in need to produce and re-stock on numerous occasions after a photo was posted on her Instagram account.

Adidas dubbed Son as a MZ generation style icon alongside Mino of Winner.

Other ventures

Endorsements 

German sportswear brand, Adidas Korea announced Son was selected as its newest model alongside world-renowned soccer players Gareth Bale and Son Heung-min. She was first revealed through a campaigning video uploaded on January 15, 2018, on their YouTube channel in correlation with the release of their "ZNE 36Hrs Hoodie".

In June 2021, Naeun was selected as the model for global skincare brand Neutrogena. As of June 15, 2021, Naeun has been selected to be the model for the brand OA's sonic toothbrush.

Philanthropy 
In celebration of her birthday, Son organized a volunteering event with her fans on February 8, 2018. They commenced with volunteer work at Kkottongnae, a welfare facility located in the North Chungcheong Province. According to her agency, Plan A Entertainment, she once visited the facility during her days in middle school and made up her mind that she would return again in the future. Previously, Son and her fans had also hand-knitted hats for newborns as well as funded wells for impoverished areas overseas.

On February 28, 2020, Son made a donation of 50 million won to the Daegu Community Chest of Korea to help support those affected by the COVID-19 pandemic. Additionally, the donation will be used towards quarantine supplies and medical support for low income families residing in Daegu.

Discography

Composition credits
All song credits are adapted from the Korea Music Copyright Association's database, unless otherwise noted.

Filmography

Film

Television series

Web series

Television shows

Radio shows

Music video appearances

Fan meeting

Ambassadorship 
 Ambassador of the 2022 Busan International Advertising Festival

Awards and nominations

Listicles

References

External links 

 
 
 

Living people
1994 births
21st-century South Korean singers
South Korean film actresses
South Korean television actresses
South Korean web series actresses
Apink members
YG Entertainment artists
People from Seoul
South Korean female idols
School of Performing Arts Seoul alumni